Yoder is a surname of Swiss German origin of which the original spelling is Joder. It
originated from the Canton of Bern in Switzerland. The name dates back to at least 1260, and is a shortened version of the name Theodore.
 
Saint Yoder (died ) is a patron saint of Valais, probably the first bishop of Octodurum.

Origin of the surname
Joderhuebel — German for Yoder Hill — is a natural fortress on the Emme River in the Swiss Canton of Berne. German researcher Karl Joder of Ludwigshafen am Rhein believes that the Yoder family was established in the region surrounding the hill before recorded history. The oldest known documentation of the Yoder family is a 1260 record of the birth of a Peter Joder in Joderhuebel.

Diaspora
Yoders were a part of a larger German migration to America between 1650 and 1730. When the Quaker William Penn established the colony of Pennsylvania, he opened it to all religious faiths, allowing complete religious freedom and worship.  He sent agents into the Rhine Valley and the Rhineland-Palatinate announcing the opportunities for settlement in his colony and assuring emigrants they would be allowed freedom of worship. Germans of all faiths came to the new colony by the thousands. They found their way down the Rhine River to Rotterdam, the great Dutch port, and embarked on slow sailing boats for Philadelphia.  Between 1700 and 1775 more than sixty thousand Germans came to America. Some ethnic Germans from the Duchy of Baden, Alsace (Elsass) and Switzerland also left Europe at French ports like Le Havre.

After taking the oath of allegiance to the English Crown, the Germans spread out into the area of southeastern Pennsylvania, looking for good land and places to make their new homes.  They settled first in what are now Bucks, Montgomery, Chester, Lancaster, and Berks Counties. Today, Yoder is a common surname among the Amish and Mennonites.

References

External links 

 The Origin of the Cult of St. Maurice
 The Yoder Newsletter, established 1983

Amish
Swiss-German surnames
Swiss-language surnames